Earl Township may refer to:

 Earl Township, LaSalle County, Illinois
 Earl Township, Berks County, Pennsylvania
 Earl Township, Lancaster County, Pennsylvania

See also 
 East Earl Township, Lancaster County, Pennsylvania
 West Earl Township, Lancaster County, Pennsylvania

Township name disambiguation pages